The Crown and Treaty is a pub on Oxford Road in Uxbridge, London, England, where Charles I and his Parliamentary opponents during the English Civil War held negotiations (the Treaty of Uxbridge) between 30 January and 22 February 1645. It is a Grade II* listed, dating from 1576.

Description
The Crown and Treaty was built in the early sixteenth century as Place House. It was two thirds larger than it is today, but was reduced in size when Oxford Road was widened to accommodate the coaching traffic in the eighteenth century, and was converted into a coaching inn. The architectural conversion was overseen by Sir John Soane

Mercury Prize-nominated band Sweet Billy Pilgrim named their 3rd album Crown and Treaty after the pub.

The interior panelling
The wood panelling was sold in 1924 to decorate an office in the Empire State Building. However, as a gift to Elizabeth II during her coronation in 1953 the panelling was reinstalled in the inn.
The pub closed for refurbishing in April 2018, and reopened on 25 October 2019.

References

Pubs in the London Borough of Hillingdon
1645 in England
History of the London Borough of Hillingdon
Grade II* listed buildings in the London Borough of Hillingdon
Grade II* listed pubs in London
Uxbridge